Pseudophaeobacter leonis is a Gram-negative, strictly aerobic and heterotrophic bacteria from the genus Pseudophaeobacter which has been isolated from anoxic marine sediments from the Gulf of Lions.

References 

Rhodobacteraceae
Bacteria described in 2013